Jens Härtel (born 7 June 1969) is a German professional football manager and former player who last managed Hansa Rostock.

Managerial statistics

Honours

Manager
Individual
 3. Liga Manager of the Season: 2017–18

References

External links

1969 births
Living people
People from Rochlitz
Association football defenders
German footballers
1. FC Lokomotive Leipzig players
FSV Zwickau players
FC Sachsen Leipzig players
1. FC Union Berlin players
SV Babelsberg 03 players
SV Germania Schöneiche players
2. Bundesliga players
3. Liga managers
1. FC Magdeburg managers
FC Hansa Rostock managers
German football managers
Footballers from Saxony
2. Bundesliga managers
Footballers from Lower Saxony